Maplecreek is an unincorporated community in Chelan County, in the U.S. state of Washington. An alternate route of U.S. Route 97 runs through the community, connecting it with Chelan about 10 miles to the northeast and Entiat about 10 miles to the south.

History
A post office called Maplecreek was established in 1908, and remained in operation until 1918. The community takes its name from nearby Maple Creek.

References

Unincorporated communities in Chelan County, Washington
Unincorporated communities in Washington (state)